Kevin John Hughes (born 14 March 1966) is a former English cricketer.  Hughes was a right-handed batsman who fielded as a wicket-keeper.  He was born in Banbury, Oxfordshire.

Hughes made his debut for Oxfordshire in a List A match in the 1991 NatWest Trophy against Surrey, with the match being abandoned.  He played 2 further List A matches, against Surrey in a replay of the abandoned match and against Lancashire in the 1992 NatWest Trophy.  In his 3 List A matches he scored 4 runs.  He didn't represent Oxfordshire in Minor counties cricket.

References

External links
Kevin Hughes at ESPNcricinfo
Kevin Hughes at CricketArchive

1966 births
Living people
Sportspeople from Banbury
English cricketers
Oxfordshire cricketers
Wicket-keepers